Dwarf coconut is a range of varieties of coconut palm. The use of the word “dwarf” here does not refer to the tree's size, as it can reach heights of 50–100 feet which is certainly not a dwarf. Instead, the dwarf designation refers to the size in which it will begin to produce the coveted or harvestable coconut.

Dwarf varieties
Other types of dwarfs are: (in alphabetical order)
Cameroon Red Dwarf
Chowghat Dwarf Green
Chowghat Dwarf Orange
Coconino
Eburnea
Equatorial Guinea Green Dwarf
Equatorial Guinea Yellow Dwarf
Fiji Dwarf: form a large bulb at the lower stem
Gangabondam
Ghana Yellow Dwarf
Gon Thembili
Haari Papua
Kelapa Gading
Kelapa Radja
Laccadive Dwarf
Lakshadweep Dwarf
Maldive Dwarf
Mangipod
Mu-see-Keo
N'uleka
Nok-koom
Pilipog
Pugai
Pumila
Rath Thembli
Regia

Malayan Dwarf
The Malayan Dwarf is a variety of dwarf coconut. The palm is classified based on the nut color: ivory yellow nuts, apricot red nuts, and green nuts. The palm's resistance to the Lethal Yellowing disease is the characteristic that makes it to be one of the important dwarf  types in the world.

Recognition of the Malayan Dwarf's resistance to lethal yellowing was in 1956 at Round Hill, Jamaica, where the Malayan Dwarfs affected by the disease was only a very small percentage.

Hybrid varieties
The Maypan coconut palm is a DwarfxTall hybrid between the Malayan Dwarf and Panama Tall. The DwarfxTall hybrid between the Malayan Dwarf (yellow) and West African Tall is locally known as Mawa, in Ivory Coast, Mawa is known as Port-Bouet-121.

There are several other varieties of coconut which have been developed by DwarfxTall hybrid process and are cultivated in India. Some of the popular hybrid varieties of coconut include Sampoorna DxT, Unnati DxT, Arjuna TxD, etc. All these varieties are a cross between tall and dwarf variety of coconuts cultivated in India.

In many coastal areas of eastern India especially West Bengal, Odisha and Andhra Pradesh where weather conditions are severely affected by cyclonic storms, Hybrid coconut cultivation as a climate resilient practice serves as a safety net mechanism for farmers.

References

Bibliography
P.K. Thampan, V.T. Markose. 1973. The Dwarf Coconut. Directorate of Coconut Development, Cochin.
Ajay Kumar Mishra, Satya Tapas, DS Rana, Sheetal Sharma, 2021. "Hybrid coconut cultivation as a climate resilient practice in Odisha to serve as a safety net mechanism for farmers", 
https://ccafs.cgiar.org/news/dwarf-hybrid-coconut-farming-climate-resilience-and-livelihood-security

Coconuts
Tropical agriculture
Trees of Barbados